is a Japanese singer and a member of the Thai idol girl group CGM48. She is also the first and current general manager of the group. She is a former member of AKB48 and BNK48.

Career 
Izuta was born in Saitama Prefecture, and joined AKB48's 10th generation lineup in March 2010. In June 19th 2010 she was drafted into the Kenkyusei (research members) position within the group. In June 24th 2012 she is promoted being a members of Team Unknown and later moved to Team A in August 2012.

After staying as Team A member, on 2014 at AKB48's Group Grand Reformation Festival she was moved to the group Team B. On 2015 she is moved to Team 4.

In July 2017 she was fully transferred to newly formed AKB48 overseas sister group BNK48. In the same year she got her first senbatsu position for the Thai version of "Koi Suru Fortune Cookie" and was also promoted to the formation of BNK48's Team BIII.

In January 2019 Izuta ranked #21 at her group single election. This also marked her first position at election during her AKB48 Group career. In July she announced that she would become CGM48's general manager. This also marked her position from BNK48 members to become CGM48 members. In 2020 she was part of CGM48 debut single senbatsu performer and filled the formation of CGM48's Team C.

In summary she is experienced as part of three different groups: AKB48, BNK48 and CGM48. She is also a part of AKB48's Team Unknown, Team A, Team B and Team 4; BNK48's Team BIII; and CGM48's Team C.

AKB48 group general election placements 
Izuta's first election was in the third edition of the AKB48 general election in 2011, while her first election in BNK48 was in 2019. Here are her placements:

 BNK48 Senbatsu general election

 AKB48 general election

Discography

Singles
AKB48

BNK48

CGM48

Other

Albums
AKB48

BNK48

Filmography

Movie

Television

References

External links

 Izurina's profile on CGM48 official website

1995 births
Living people
People from Saitama Prefecture
Japanese expatriates in Thailand
J-pop singers
Japanese idols
Japanese women singers
AKB48 members
Rina Izuta